Events from the year 1711 in Canada.

Incumbents
French Monarch: Louis XIV
British and Irish Monarch: Anne

Governors
Governor General of New France: Philippe de Rigaud Vaudreuil
Colonial Governor of Louisiana: Jean-Baptiste Le Moyne de Bienville
Governor of Nova Scotia: Jean-Baptiste Le Moyne de Bienville
Governor of Plaisance: Philippe Pastour de Costebelle

Events
 1711-13 - Tuscarora War on North Carolina frontier fought between British settlers and Tuscarora Indians. Under the English Col. John Barnwell, then Col. James Moore, the Tuscarora Nation was repeatedly attacked, its chiefs tortured, its people sold (10 pounds sterling each) into slavery. The survivors fled northward and settled among the Haudenosee (Iroquois) 5 Nations.

Births
 June 8 – Charles Morris, Canadian judge (d. 1781)
 June 16 – François-Louis de Pourroy de Lauberivière, bishop of Quebec (died 1740), born in Grenoble, France.
 August 19 – Daniel Liénard de Beaujeu, Canadian officer during the Seven Years' War (d. 1755)

References 

 
Canada
11